Kinki may refer to:

 Kansai region, Japan; also called the Kinki region
 Kansai dialect, also called Kinki dialect
 Kinki Expressway, Osaka, Japan
 Kindai University, formerly called Kinki University
 Kinki Nihon, baseball team
 Kinki Nippon Electric Railway
 Kinki Sharyo, rail equipment manufacturer
 Kinki (film genre), a Spanish film genre focused on delinquents 
 Kinki Dynasty, better known as the Yamato Dynasty

See also
 Kansai (disambiguation), "Kansai" also called "Kinki"
 
 
 Kinky (disambiguation)
 Kink (disambiguation)